William Douglas Leitch (1863 – 1943 ), born on 16 December 1863 in Hobart, Tasmania to Scottish settlers John Leitch and Jean McCrone from Paisley, Renfrewshire, was a Tasmanian footballer, businessman and sports administrator. Leitch was an employee and later board of directors member of Henry Jones's IXL jam manufacturing business; taking his first job at the company at the age of only ten alongside Sir Henry Jones placing labels on jam tins, and working there until his death, he gave almost seventy years continuous service. Many of his sons would also have careers working for the firm during their lifetimes.

In his youth Leitch was a highly regarded Australian rules football player at the Railway Football Club. In later life he was a patron of Australian rules football in Tasmania, and was a long-time Tasmanian delegate to the Australian National Football Council. The William Leitch Medal for the fairest and best player in the Tasmanian Australian National Football League was named in his honour.

He was married to Jane Littlejohn (1865 - 1948) at Chalmer's Free Presbyterian church on 17 September 1884, with whom he had 13 children; Elsie May (1883 - 1949), William Douglas (1885 - 1919), John Stanley George (1886 - 1962), Gilbert Barry (1888 - 1972), Dorothy (1890 - 1976), Daniel (1891 - 1891), Edith Isabel (1893 - 1978), Elvira Jean (1894 - 1982), Olive Mary Ruth (1896 - 1946), Winifred Jane (1898 - 1987), Ronald Bruce (1901 - 1966), Alan McDonald (1902 - 1976), and Basil James (1907 - 1974). 

One of his sons, Alan McDonald Leitch, was also an inductee of the AFL hall of fame, having played for New Town and later Carlton.

William Leitch died  at his home on Arthur Street, North Hobart on 24 May 1943. His remains were cremated at the Cornelian Bay Crematorium chapel.

References

1863 births
1943 deaths
Australian rules footballers from Tasmania
Tasmanian Football Hall of Fame inductees